Freisinger may refer to:

Freisinger Motorsport, a German auto racing team

People with the surname
Leo Freisinger (1916–1985), American speed skater